E. nivalis may refer to:
 Entomobrya nivalis, an arthropod species
 Eucobresia nivalis, a mollusc species